The 2021 BMW Open was a men's tennis tournament played on outdoor clay courts. It was the 105th edition of the event and part of the ATP Tour 250 series of the 2021 ATP Tour. It took place at the MTTC Iphitos complex in Munich, Germany, from 26 April until 2 May 2021.

Finals

Singles

  Nikoloz Basilashvili def.  Jan-Lennard Struff, 6–4, 7–6(7–5)

Doubles

  Wesley Koolhof /  Kevin Krawietz def.  Sander Gillé /  Joran Vliegen, 4–6, 6–4, [10–5]

Points and prize money

Point distribution

Prize money 

*per team

Singles main draw entrants

Seeds

1 Rankings are as of 19 April 2021.

Other entrants
The following players received wildcards into the main draw:
  Yannick Hanfmann
  Philipp Kohlschreiber
  Maximilian Marterer 

The following players received entry as special exempt:
  Taro Daniel

The following players received entry from the qualifying draw:
  Daniel Elahi Galán
  Ilya Ivashka
  Mackenzie McDonald
  Cedrik-Marcel Stebe

The following players received entry as lucky losers:
  Ričardas Berankis
  Norbert Gombos
  Andrej Martin

Withdrawals 
Before the tournament
  Dan Evans → replaced by  Egor Gerasimov
  Márton Fucsovics → replaced by  Ričardas Berankis
  Hubert Hurkacz → replaced by  Thiago Monteiro
  Aslan Karatsev → replaced by  Norbert Gombos
  Yoshihito Nishioka → replaced by  Pablo Cuevas
  Jannik Sinner → replaced by  Sebastian Korda
  Lorenzo Sonego → replaced by  Alexei Popyrin
  Stefano Travaglia → replaced by  Andrej Martin
  Jiří Veselý → replaced by  Federico Coria

During the tournament
  Yannick Hanfmann

Retirements
  Egor Gerasimov
  Guido Pella

Doubles main draw entrants

Seeds

1 Rankings are as of 19 April 2021

Other entrants
The following pairs received wildcards into the doubles main draw:
  Dustin Brown /  Peter Gojowczyk
  Marcelo Melo /  Mischa Zverev

Withdrawals 
Before the tournament
  Wesley Koolhof /  Łukasz Kubot → replaced by  Andrey Golubev /  Andrea Vavassori
  Kevin Krawietz /  Horia Tecău → replaced by  Yannick Hanfmann /  Dominik Koepfer
  Marcelo Melo /  Jean-Julien Rojer → replaced by  Harri Heliövaara /  Emil Ruusuvuori
  Rajeev Ram /  Joe Salisbury → replaced by  Wesley Koolhof /  Kevin Krawietz
  Ken Skupski /  Neal Skupski → replaced by  Jonathan Erlich /  Divij Sharan

During the tournament
  Federico Coria /  Guido Pella
  Yannick Hanfmann /  Dominik Koepfer
  Jonny O'Mara /  Aisam-ul-Haq Qureshi

References

External links 
Official website

Bavarian International Tennis Championships
BMW Open
BMW Open
BMW Open
BMW Open